In mathematics, Rado's theorem or Radó's theorem may refer to:
Tibor Radó's theorem (harmonic functions)
Tibor Radó's theorem (Riemann surfaces)
Richard Rado's theorem (Ramsey theory)
Richard Rado's theorem (matroid theory)